Michael Vestergaard Knudsen (born 4 September 1978) is a Danish team handball player. He is a European Champion, having won the 2008 European Men's Handball Championship with the Danish national handball team. He received a bronze medal at the 2007 World Men's Handball Championship, where he was voted into the All-star-team (as Pivot). In 2011 he won a silver medal at the world championships, with Denmark losing to France in what was described as "the most thrilling World Championships final since decades".

At the 2006 European Men's Handball Championship he was number three on the top scoring list, and the Danish team received bronze medals, as they did in 2002 and 2004. Knudsen currently plays for Danish side Bjerringbro-Silkeborg.  In 2014, he was part of the Danish team that won the silver medal at the European Championship.

At Olympic level, he has represented Denmark at the 2008 and 2012 Summer Olympics.

Honours
Danish Championship:
: 2016

References

External links
 Michael Knudsen on the website of SG Flensburg-Handewitt

1978 births
Living people
Danish male handball players
Olympic handball players of Denmark
Handball players at the 2008 Summer Olympics
Handball players at the 2012 Summer Olympics
Viborg HK players
SG Flensburg-Handewitt players
People from Hobro
Sportspeople from the North Jutland Region